(real name Kiyoshi Karasawa (唐澤 潔 Karasawa Kiyoshi)) is a Japanese theatre and film actor. He made his theatrical debut in the play Boy's Revue Stay Gold (ボーイズレビュー・ステイゴールド Bōizu Rebyū Sutei Gōrudo) in 1987. He specializes in theatrical action sequences such as swordplay and fighting. He dubbed over the roles of Tom Hanks in the Toy Story series, and The Polar Express.

He has been nominated for two Japanese Academy Awards, and was named Best Newcomer in 1992. He married actress Tomoko Yamaguchi on December 15, 1995.

Filmography

Television
Totteoki no Seishun (NHK, 1988)
Kasuga no Tsubone (NHK, 1989) – Inaba Masakatsu
Wataru Seken wa Oni Bakari (TBS, 1990, season 1)
Otoko ni Tsuite (TBS, 1990)
Kekkon no Risou to Genjitsu (Fuji TV, 1991)
Ai to iu Nano Moto ni (Fuji TV, 1992)
Homework (TBS, 1992)
Nichiyo wa Dame yo (NTV, 1993)
Imoto Yo (Fuji TV, 1994)
Oishinbo (Fuji TV, 1994-1999)
Kagayake! Rintaro (TBS, 1995)
Furuhata Ninzaburo (Fuji TV, 1996, season 2, ep19)
Oishii Kankei (Fuji TV, 1996)
Boku ga Boku de Aru Tame ni(Fuji TV, 1997)
Souri to Yobanaide (Fuji TV, 1997)
Ii Hito (Fuji TV, 1997, ep7)
Eve (Fuji TV, 1997)
Brothers (Fuji TV, 1998)
Aikotoba wa Yūki(Fuji TV, 2000)
Love Complex (Fuji TV, 2000)
Toshiie and Matsu  (NHK, 2002) – Maeda Toshiie
Shiroi Kyotō (Fuji TV, 2003)
Hachiro  (NHK, 2005)
Kobayakawa Nobuki no Koi(Fuji TV, 2006)
Komyo ga Tsuji (NHK, 2006, guest star, ep39&40) – Maeda Toshiie
Akechi Mitsuhide (Fuji TV, 2007) – Akechi Mitsuhide
Galileo (Fuji TV, 2007, ep1)
Fumo Chitai (Fuji TV, 2009)
Guilty Akuma to Keiyakushita Onna (Fuji TV, 2010)
Strangers 6 (WOWOW/Fuji TV/MBC, 2012)
Higashino Keigo Mysteries (Fuji TV, 2012, Story 1)
Made in Japan (NHK, 2013)
Take Five: Oretachi wa Ai o Nusumeruka (TBS, 2013)
Roosevelt Game (TV Asahi, 2014)
The Last Cop (NTV, 2015) – Kōsuke Kyōgoku
Napoleon no Mura (TBS, 2015)
Toto Neechan  (NHK, 2016) – Isaji Hanayama
Montage  (Fuji TV, 2016) – Tetsuya Narumi
Harassment Game (TV Tokyo, 2018) - Wataru Akitsu
The Good Wife (TBS, 2019) - Soichiro Hasumi
Voice: 110 Emergency Control Room (NTV, 2019) - Shōgo Higuchi
Yell (NHK, 2020) - Saburō
24 Japan (TV Asahi, 2020) - Genma Shido

Film
Oishi Kekkon (1991)
Hello Ganbari Nezumi (1991)
Future Memories: Last Christmas (1992)
Koukou Kyoushi (1993)
Kimi wo Wasurenai (1995)
Koi wa Mai Orita (1997)
Welcome Back, Mr. McDonald (1997)
Minna no Ie (2001) aka Everyone's Home
Casshern (2004)
20th Century Boys (2008)
Snakes and Earrings (2008)
Oba: The Last Samurai (2011)
In The Hero (2014)
Persona Non Grata (2015) – Chiune Sugihara
The Last Cop (2017) – Kōsuke Kyōgoku

Dubbing roles
Tom Hanks as
 Woody in Toy Story, Toy Story 2, Toy Story 3 and Toy Story 4
 Hero Boy, the Conductor, the Hobo, Santa Claus, Scrooge, Hero Boy's father in The Polar Express

Main awards
1991 - 65th Kinema Junpo - Best Ten New Male Actor
1992 - 15th Japan academy award - Rookie of the Year
1993 - 17th Elan d'or Awards - Newcomer of the Year
2003 - 11th Hashida Prize
2008 - Heisei 19 Agency for Cultural Affairs'

References

External links
 
Ken-On Official Homepage 

1963 births
Living people
People from Tokyo
Japanese male actors
Ken-On artists
Taiga drama lead actors